Neds Corner is a locality in Victoria, Australia.  It is located approximately 31 km from Cullulleraine, Victoria and bordered to the north by the Murray River.

Within the area of the locality is the smaller area of Kulnine, and Lock 9 on the Murray which had a Post Office open from 1923 until 1969.

See also
Neds Corner Station

References

Towns in Victoria (Australia)
Populated places on the Murray River